Association football, or soccer, is the most popular sport in Benin. Governed by the Benin Football Federation, the Benin national football team (Les Ecureuils ) joined both FIFA and CAF in 1969 as Dahomey. Dahomey became Benin in 1975.

Les Ecureuils
Les Ecureuils (The Squirrels, as the national squad is nicknamed) have never qualified for the World Cup and made their only appearance in the African Cup of Nations in 2004. They enjoyed their highest world ranking as of September 2007 with a rank of 79th in the world. The home stadium is Stade de l'Amitié in Cotonou.

Notable Beninese footballers
Romuald Boco
Laurent D'Jaffo
Moussa Latoundji
Stéphane Sessègnon
Rudy Gestede

Benin football stadiums

References